Philip Stephen Hancock (24 November 1925 – 1 November 2015) was a British television and stage actor, musical director and pianist.

He was born in Bishop Auckland, County Durham and attended the Chorister School, Durham and the Darlington Grammar School before reading music at Durham University as a mature student. He served as a radio engineer in the Royal Air Force during World War II.

He was best known for his role as Ernest Bishop in Coronation Street. Introduced as wedding photographer Gordon Bishop in a 1967 episode dedicated to one of Elsie Tanner's marriages, he later re-emerged as the regular character Ernie and played the character from 1969 until being written out in a fatal shooting during a burglary at Mike Baldwin's factory in 1978. Late minor TV roles included appearances in Victoria Wood as Seen on TV in 1985/1986. He appeared as Mr Lillie in the Tales of the Unexpected (TV series) episode (9/6) "Wink Three Times" (1988).

He was also musical director of many stage productions and composed music for radio.

His brother was the late Christopher Hancock who played Charlie Cotton in EastEnders. In 2011 he appeared in a Coronation Street tribute programme.

References

External links
 

1925 births
2015 deaths
English male soap opera actors
Actors from County Durham
People educated at the Chorister School, Durham
Royal Air Force personnel of World War II
Alumni of the College of St Hild and St Bede, Durham